The Dublin Harbour Police is a small, specialised police force in Dublin Port, Ireland operating under the jurisdiction of the Dublin Port Company.

The force has the power of arrest under Section 59 of the Harbours Act 1996 , to arrest persons in connection with offences under the Act, although they are then required to hand them over to the Garda Síochána. Prior to the passage of the Act, the Harbour Police were under the employ of the Dublin Port and Docks Board and were sworn as constables under the Harbour, Docks & Piers Clauses Act 1847.

In 2008, because Dublin Port Company was unwilling or unable to pay the wages of officers, the vast majority (at least 20) officers were made redundant (after a voluntary arrangement of over 200,000 euro paid to each officer) Access control will be undertaken by contracted private security companies, however at least three officers are legally obliged to remain at the port to enforce bye-laws.

See also
 Dun Laoghaire Harbour Police

Specialist law enforcement agencies of the Republic of Ireland
Emergency services in the Republic of Ireland
Port law enforcement agencies